Thermoniphas bibundana, the Cameroon chalk blue, is a butterfly in the family Lycaenidae. It is found in Cameroon.

References

Endemic fauna of Cameroon
Butterflies described in 1910
Thermoniphas